Camp Ramah in Canada, is a Jewish summer camp located at Skeleton Lake in Utterson in Muskoka, Ontario, approximately two hours north of Toronto. Part of the National Ramah Commission, Ramah is affiliated with the United Synagogue of Conservative Judaism. Camp Ramah in Canada was founded in 1960, and attracts approximately 500 campers each year from Canada, the United States, the United Kingdom, and Israel.

References

External links
National Ramah Commission
Website

Canada
Youth organizations based in Canada
Buildings and structures in the District Municipality of Muskoka
Jewish summer camps in Canada
Jews and Judaism in Ontario
Conservative Judaism in Canada